The men's pole vault event at the 1999 European Athletics U23 Championships was held in Göteborg, Sweden, at Ullevi on 30 July and 1 August 1999.

Medalists

Results

Final
1 August

†: Series not exactly known.

Qualifications
30 July
First 12 best to the Final

Participation
According to an unofficial count, 15 athletes from 9 countries participated in the event.

 (1)
 (1)
 (3)
 (3)
 (2)
 (1)
 (2)
 (1)
 (1)

References

Pole vault
Pole vault at the European Athletics U23 Championships